Defy is the fifth studio album by American rock band Of Mice & Men. It was released on January 19, 2018, through Rise Records. The album was produced by Howard Benson and is the follow-up to the group's fourth album, Cold World (2016). This is the first album to feature Aaron Pauley as the sole lead vocalist following the departure of Austin Carlile, who left the band in late 2016 due to health issues. It sold 9,400 copies in the US in its first week.

Track listing

Personnel
Credits adapted from AllMusic.

Of Mice & Men
 Aaron Pauley – lead vocals, bass
 Alan Ashby – rhythm guitar, backing vocals
 Phil Manansala – lead guitar, backing vocals
 Valentino Arteaga – drums, percussion, backing vocals on "Unbreakable"

Additional personnel
 Howard Benson – production, recording
 Mike Plotnikoff – co-production, engineering
 Hatsukazu Inagaki – engineering
 Zach Darf, Trevor Dietrich and Nik Karpen – assistant engineering
 Chris Lord-Alge – mixing
 Adam Chagnon – additional engineering
 Ted Jensen and Chris Athens – mastering
 Paul DeCarli – editing
 Marc VanGool – guitar technician
 Jon Nicholson – drum technician
 Charles Tsuei – assisting
 Stevie Aiello – composition on "Back to Me" and "How Will You Live"
 Roger Waters – composition on "Money"
 Scott Stephens – composition on "On the Inside"
 Lindsey Byrnes – band photography
 Kevin Moore – art direction, design
 Laurie Belotti – art direction, design assisting

Charts

References

2018 albums
Of Mice & Men (band) albums
Rise Records albums
Albums produced by Howard Benson